In enzymology, a diphosphate-serine phosphotransferase is an enzyme that catalyzes the chemical reaction

diphosphate + L-serine  phosphate + O-phospho-L-serine

Thus, the two substrates of this enzyme are diphosphate and L-serine, whereas its two products are phosphate and O-phospho-L-serine.

This enzyme belongs to the family of transferases, specifically those transferring phosphorus-containing groups (phosphotransferases) with an alcohol group as acceptor.  The systematic name of this enzyme class is diphosphate:L-serine O-phosphotransferase. Other names in common use include pyrophosphate-serine phosphotransferase, and pyrophosphate-L-serine phosphotransferase.

References

 

EC 2.7.1
Enzymes of unknown structure